At the Arena ov Aion – Live Apostasy is the first live album by Polish extreme metal band Behemoth. It was released on 31 October 2008 through Regain Records. The album was recorded live at La Loco in Paris, France, on 17 February 2008 during the European Apostasy tour. The record was then mixed and edited in the Antfarm Studio, Denmark in June 2008. Additional editing took place in the Soundsgreat Studio in Poland during April and May 2008. The record was then mastered at the Cutting Room Studios in Stockholm, Sweden, in July 2008.

The live album was also released as a digibook including 17 tracks. A limited metalbox edition (including a patch, a guitar pick and 2 bonus songs) was announced but never came to fruition due to Regain Records financial problems.

Track listing 

Bonus tracks
Bonus tracks that were supposed to be included in metalbox version only (never released)

Personnel 

 Behemoth
 Adam "Nergal" Darski – vocals, guitars, lyrics
 Tomasz "Orion" Wróblewski – bass, backing vocals
 Zbigniew Robert "Inferno" Promiński – drums and percussion

 Additional musicians
 Patryk Dominik "Seth" Sztyber – guitars, backing vocals

 Note
Recorded live in La Loco, Paris on 17 February 2008 during "European Apostasy" tour. 
Mixed and edited, June 2008. 
Additional editing in Soundsgreat Studio, Poland, April–May 2008  
Mastered, July 2008. 

 Production
 Tomasz Danilowicz – cover concept and artwork direction
 Graal – cover design and artwork
 Bjorn Engelmann – mastering
 Tue Madsen – mixing, editing
 Kuba Mankowski (Pneuma) – editing
 Agnieszka Krysiuk – live photography
 Daniel Falk – live photography
 Martn Darksoul – live photography
 Shelley Jambresic – live photography
 Stephane Buriez – recording
 Tomasz Krajewski – lyrics of From the Pagan Vastlands
 Krzysztof Azarewicz – lyrics

Release history

References 

Behemoth (band) live albums
2008 live albums
Regain Records live albums
Albums produced by Adam Darski